Vasil Konstantionov Tanev (9 October 1897 – 21 November 1941) was a Bulgarian Communist, one of the three Bulgarian Comintern operatives arrested and tried for complicity in the Reichstag fire in 1933.

Biography

Tanev was born in Gevgelija, in the Salonica Vilayet of the Ottoman Empire (present-day North Macedonia) and joined the Bulgarian Communist Party in 1919. After the failure of the September Uprising of 1923 he fled to the Kingdom of Yugoslavia, then moved between Communist Russia and secret missions in Bulgaria.

In 1933 Tanev was in Germany working for the Comintern under Georgi Dimitrov. On 9 March 1933 Tanev, Dimitrov and Blagoy Popov, along with others were arrested and charged with complicity in the Reichstag fire.  All three were acquitted.

Tanev was acclaimed as a hero on his return to Russia, but was forced into self-denunciation later in the 1930s. The Bulgarian Communist Party ordered him to carry out a mission in Bulgaria in 1941. He was killed later in that year near Langadas.

References

1897 births
1941 deaths
People from Gevgelija
People from Salonica vilayet
Macedonian Bulgarians
Bulgarian communists
Bulgarian resistance members
Bulgarian people imprisoned abroad
International Lenin School alumni